20/20 is the second studio album from Christian rap artist Trip Lee.  The album was released in 2008, through Reach Records. The album debuted at No. 193 on the Billboard 200.

Reception
The album received generally positive reviews; Trailblaza of Rapzilla had the following to say about the album. "Overall, this is a very solid sophomore release from Trip Lee and 20/20 definitely accomplishes its intended goal of seeing the Lord clearer. If you don't walk away from this album with 20/20 vision of our Lord, then you need to take your spiritual blinders off and listen to this album again."

Track listing

References

2008 albums
Trip Lee albums
Reach Records albums
Albums produced by Gawvi
Albums produced by DJ Official